The task system is a system of labor under slavery characteristic in the Americas. It is usually regarded as less brutal than other forms of slave labor. The other form, known as the gang system, was harsher.  Under this system, each slave is assigned a specific task to complete for the day.  After that task is finished, the slave is then free to do as he or she wishes with the remaining time. The gang systems forced the slaves to work until the owner said they were finished and allowed them almost no freedom. Whether plantation owners organized their slaves on the task or gang system had much to do with the type of crops they harvested. Tobacco and sugar cultivation was organized into gangs since those crops required considerable processing and supervision. Coffee, rice, and pimento were comparatively hardier plants where extensive supervision was unnecessary, leading planters to favor the task system on their plantations.

Early rice task system
Evidence suggests that the task system, in some places, included a gender dimension.  The women laborers played a major role in the work force for rice cultivation in South Carolina.  This was a division of labor that transferred directly from West African cultures. Women were responsible for the planting, weeding, harvesting, threshing, and polishing of the rice crop.  Men were responsible for building canals and rice fields, flooding and draining fields, and protecting the crops from animals.  

This gendered division of labor that was already in place in the African tribal systems of rice cultivation before the Atlantic slave trade brought the slaves over to the American colonies. It was an aspect of the constellation of skills and technologies used in traditional African rice cultivation. The slaves used this knowledge to bargain with the plantation owners to gain more control over their work. It gave the plantation owners a greater knowledge of this new and non-indigenous form of farming.

"Planters knew that slaves grew rice; they also know which ethnic groups specialized in its cultivation. This knowledge came from their sustained contact with slaves in shaping the Carolina frontier and growing food staples for mutual survival."

The highly developed and knowledgeable skills concerning rice planting possessed by slaves led to their successful ability to use these skills as a bargaining chip in determining the length and conditions of their bondage in the Americas.

See also
Gang system

References 

Slavery in North America
Slavery in South America
Slavery in the Caribbean